The Annales du service des antiquités de l'Égypte (ASAE) (English: Annals of the Egyptian Antiquities Service) is a research publication focused on Egyptology that began in 1900. The work was published by the Egyptian Department of Antiquities (1900–1971), the Egyptian Antiquities Organization (1971–1993), and the Supreme Council of Antiquities (1993–2011). From 1988 until 1997, the publication was issued as Annales du Service des Antiquités Égyptiennes before reverting to its original name. Recent back issues of the periodical are currently sold by the American University in Cairo Press.

References

External links
 Annales du service des antiquités de l'Égypte (190020) at Gallica
 Select volumes at Archive.org

Egyptology journals
French-language journals
Publications established in 1900